John Broughton (born 1952) is an Australian amateur astronomer and artist. He is among the most prolific discoverers of minor planets worldwide, credited by the Minor Planet Center with more than a thousand discoveries made between 1997 and 2008. His observations are done at Reedy Creek Observatory , in Queensland, Australia.

In 2002, Broughton was one of five astronomers to be awarded a "Gene Shoemaker NEO Grant" by the Planetary Society to support his work on near-Earth asteroids. The money enabled the purchase of a CCD camera for use initially on a 10" SCT and later on a 20" f/2.7 automated telescope he designed and constructed, with first light occurring 10 April 2004.

Asteroid 24105 Broughton was named in his honour in 2005, and he later won an Australian national award the 2008 Page Medal.

Discoveries and research 

He is the discoverer of four near-Earth objects, two of which are potentially hazardous asteroids (PHA). Discovered 11 April 2004 on the first full night of operations with the 20" telescope, Apollo asteroid  is one of only 157 known kilometer-size PHAs and the largest such discovery made by a non-professional astronomer. The short-period comet P/2005 T5 (Broughton) was discovered in October, 2005, followed nine months later by the hyperbolic comet C/2006 OF2 (Broughton) at a distant 7.7 AU from the sun and more than two years from reaching perihelion.

In 2003 he began observing asteroid occultations by taking trailed CCD exposures and measuring the resulting dips in brightness. Subsequently, he developed methods and applications to facilitate the observation, timing and analysis. By 2010 he had switched to using sensitive video cameras, and began designing telescopes better suited to multi-station field work than what is commercially available, culminating in collapsible alt-alt telescopes of moderate size, compact enough to take anywhere in the world in standard airline baggage. In 2011 he formulated a method to derive asteroid dimensions by integrating the results of separate occultations. The tables are periodically updated and now include over 500 asteroids.

List of discovered minor planets

See also 
 Asteroid 15092 Beegees

References

External links 
 Mention of the Shoemaker Grant, and Broughton's discovery of 
 March 2007 report of work done through the end of 2006, including discovery of C/2006 OF2 (Broughton)
 Drift-Scan Timing of Asteroid Occultations
 Asteroid Dimensions From Occultations

1952 births
20th-century Australian astronomers
Amateur astronomers
21st-century Australian astronomers
Discoverers of asteroids
Discoverers of comets

Living people